Bruno Henrique Santos Sant'Anna (born 12 July 1993) is a Brazilian tennis player.

Sant'Anna has a career high ATP singles ranking of 337, achieved on 7 October 2013. He also has a career high ATP doubles ranking of 313 achieved on 23 May 2016.

Sant'Anna made his ATP main draw debut at the 2012 Brasil Open, where he and Rogério Dutra da Silva received a wildcard into the doubles event. The pair lost in the first round to the second seeds, Daniele Bracciali and Potito Starace, 4–6, 4–6.

ATP Challenger and ITF Futures finals

Singles: 21 (10–11)

Doubles: 33 (16–17)

External links
 
 

1993 births
Living people
Brazilian male tennis players
People from São José dos Campos
Sportspeople from São Paulo (state)
21st-century Brazilian people
20th-century Brazilian people